Isaiaruvi is 24-hours Tamil music channel launched in 2008 by Kalaignar TV Private Limited. The channel features Kollywood Tamil music and programs. The channel is currently broadcast in many other countries apart from India such asin United States, Australia, United Kingdom, Canada, Europe, New Zealand, Saudi Arabia, Qatar, Middle East and UAE.

References

External links 
 Isaiaruvi on Facebook

Tamil-language television stations
Tamil-language television channels
Television stations in Chennai
Music television channels in India
Television channels and stations established in 2008
2008 establishments in Tamil Nadu